Harry "Nipper" Marsham (19 July 1890 – 31 December 1932) was a player for Geelong and Richmond in the VFL between 1909 and 1919.

Family
His son, Alan Marsham, also played with Geelong.

Football
He played as a ruckman and forward for Geelong for seven seasons.

When Geelong were unable to compete in 1916 due to World War I, he crossed to Richmond. 

Marsham returned to Geelong for the 1917 season and captained the club that year. He retired at the end of the 1919 season.

Death
He died at his South Geelong residence on 31 December 1932.

References

External links

1890 births
1932 deaths
Australian rules footballers from Melbourne
Australian Rules footballers: place kick exponents
Chilwell Football Club players
Geelong Football Club players
Richmond Football Club players
People from Carlton, Victoria